Cissa was reported as the viceroy of king Centwine of Wessex (reigned c. 676–686).  Cissa is sometimes said to have himself been a king of Wessex, but does not feature in the king lists or genealogies.  He is said to have constructed Chisbury Camp, and to have founded Abingdon Abbey.

References

Kelly, S. E. 2000. Charters of Abingdon Abbey, part 1. Anglo-Saxon Charters 7.

External links 
 

Anglo-Saxon royalty
7th-century English people